Hourman (Rex Tyler) is a fictional superhero appearing in comics published by DC Comics. He is known as the original Hourman (spelled Hour-Man in his earliest appearances, also referred to as The Hour-Man, and The Hourman). He was created by writer Ken Fitch and artist Bernard Baily in Adventure Comics #48 (April 1940), during the Golden Age of Comic Books. He continued to appear in Adventure Comics until issue #83 (Feb 1943).

Rex Tyler made his live-action debut in the first season of DC's Legends of Tomorrow before becoming a guest star in the second season, portrayed by Patrick J. Adams. Rex Tyler also appeared in the first season of the DC Universe series Stargirl, portrayed by Lou Ferrigno Jr.

Fictional character biography
Scientist Rex Tyler, raised in upstate New York, developed an affinity for chemistry, particularly biochemistry. Working his way through college, he landed a job researching vitamins and hormone supplements at Bannermain Chemical. A series of discoveries and accidents led him to the "miraculous vitamin" Miraclo. He found that concentrated doses of the "miraclo" given to test mice increased their strength and vitality several times that of normal, but only for one hour. After taking a dose himself, Rex found he could have superhuman strength and speed for an hour, before returning to human levels.

Keeping the discovery of Miraclo a secret, Tyler decided that human trials would be limited to the only subject he could trust: himself. Feeling that the Miraclo-induced abilities should be used for good purposes, he decided to use the abilities to help those in need; in other words, he would become a superhero, based in Appleton City. He received his first mission by placing an ad stating that "The Man of The Hour" would help the needy. Tracking down one responder to the ad, he aided a housewife whose husband was falling in with the wrong crowd, and stopped a robbery. Using a costume he found in an abandoned costume shop, he started to adventure as The Hour-Man (later dropping the hyphen). In November 1940 Hourman became one of the founding members of the first superhero team, the Justice Society of America. After leaving the JSA in mid-1941 Tyler became one of Uncle Sam's initial group of Freedom Fighters. He later became part of the wartime All-Star Squadron.

According to Jess Nevins' Encyclopedia of Golden Age Superheroes, "Hourman fights a variety of Doctors: the robot-wielding Dr. Darrk, the hypnotist Dr. Feher, the big-headed genius Dr. Glisten; the occultist and alchemist Dr. Iker; and the bio-engineer Dr. Togg. There is also the 90-Minute Man, who gains Hourman-like powers for 90 minutes from his radium armor".

Hourman was one of many heroes whose popularity began to decline in the post-war years. Eventually, his adventures ended, but with the resurgence of super-heroes in the mid-1950s and early 1960s, interest in the Golden Age heroes returned, and Hourman was soon appearing as a guest star in issues of Justice League of America. Like all the other Golden Agers, he was now considered an elder statesman of the super-hero set.

Unlike some other Golden Age heroes, his character continued to grow more complex. The idea that Miraclo was addictive, combined with the suggestion that Tyler himself was addicted to crime fighting, made Hourman one of the superhero world's first cautionary tales. Rex continued to fight both of his addictions throughout the rest of his appearances. His character was seemingly killed off along with other Golden Age heroes fighting a time-traveling villain named Extant, during the Zero Hour crisis, when Extant increased Rex's temporal rate to age him to death. He was rescued from that fate by the third Hourman and put in a pocket dimension called the Timepoint. Rex would remain there for one hour, but that time would only pass when he was visited by his son, after which Rex would have to return to the confrontation with Extant so that history would unfold as it had. For a time, Rick used this to talk with Rex about various issues, ranging from his own issues with his and Rex's past relationship, his personal issues with his gambling addiction, or even asking Rex for advice in dealing with the latest plot of the Ultra-Humanite after he possessed Johnny Thunder and took the power of the Thunderbolt for himself.

However, when Rick was wounded in a fight with Nemesis, he transferred himself to the Timepoint and placed his tachyon-infused hourglass (one of the components that let him travel to that pocket dimension) around his father's neck. Rex was sent back in the role of Hourman until the android Hourman returned to take the JSA to the Timepoint and retrieve Rick. When the Timepoint ended just as Rick's injuries had been treated, Rick and Rex fought to try to return to Zero Hour, but the android Hourman took his place in that battle. Rex now lives in semi-retirement with his wife Wendi, noting that he intended to rebuild his relationship with Wendi and also work on reconstructing the android Hourman based on his remaining pieces. Rex has his old Hourman costume, and a bowl full of Miraclo inside a secret compartment of the grandfather clock in his bedroom which opens when both hands are turned to 12.

Due to the addictive nature of Miraclo (he later invented a non-addictive formula), the way that Hourman accessed his powers changed somewhat over the years. At one point in his career, he would use a black light lantern (similar to the Golden Age Green Lantern) that would activate a residue of Miraclo still in his body. Later, in JSA (Vol 2), Johnny Quick theorized that his power stemmed from Rex's metagene, and that his powers could be accessed without the need for Miraclo. Rex used the mantra "Man of the Hour" taught to him by Quick (who used a similar mantra to access his own powers) to gain his strength and speed, though they were still limited to one hour's time.

Rex later provides technical support for the new JSA All-Stars team, of whom his son was a member, helping them put together their new headquarters. He is enjoying a semi-retirement with his wife, Wendi.

In the "Watchmen" sequel "Doomsday Clock", Lois Lane finds a flash-drive among the mess while at the Daily Planet. It shows her footage of Hourman and the rest of the Justice Society.

During the "Dark Nights: Death Metal" storyline, Hourman is among the superheroes that were revived by Batman using a Black Lantern ring.

Powers and abilities
Through the use of Miraclo, Hourman can possess superhuman strength, speed, stamina, and durability, night vision, underwater survival, and expert martial arts skills for one full hour.

In other media

Television
 Rex Tyler appears in the Batman: The Brave and the Bold episode "The Golden Age of Justice!", voiced by Lex Lang. This version uses an hourglass-shaped device to fuel his powers instead of Miraclo and appears as a member of an aged Justice Society of America.
 Rex Tyler appears in the Robot Chicken episode "Tapping a Hero", voiced by Seth Green. He promotes an erectile dysfunction pill guaranteed to make people "an hour-man, just like [him]".
 Rex Tyler appears in Legends of Tomorrow, portrayed by Patrick J. Adams. This version is the leader of the Justice Society of America, who were active in the 1940s. At the end of the first season, he warns the Legends not to travel to 1942 due to their impending deaths, only to vanish shortly afterwards. In the second season, the team meets Tyler's past self when they ignore his warning. Tyler is later killed by the Reverse-Flash, erasing his future self who had discovered the Reverse-Flash's plans and warned the Legends from existence. Before his death, Rex was in a relationship with Vixen, who goes after and later joins the Legends to avenge Rex.
 Rex Tyler appears in Stargirl, portrayed by Lou Ferrigno Jr. This version uses an hourglass amulet to achieve his powers and is a member of the Justice Society of America (JSA). Ten years prior to the series, he was with the JSA when the Injustice Society of America (ISA) attacked their headquarters. Having survived, he and his wife Wendi tracked the ISA to Blue Valley before they were killed by Solomon Grundy. They are survived by a son, Rick Tyler, who would go on to take up his father's mantle and amulet to avenge his parents.

Film
 Rex Tyler appears in the opening credits of Justice League: The New Frontier, in which he falls to his death while running from police officers due to a ban on vigilantes.
 Rex Tyler appears in Justice Society: World War II, voiced by Matthew Mercer. This version hails from Earth-2 and is a founding member of the Justice Society of America, who are active during their Earth's version of the titular war.

References

External links
 Grand Comics Database
 Hourman at Don Markstein's Toonopedia. Archived from the original on February 5, 2016.
 Comics Archives: JSA Fact File: Hourman I
 DC Indexes: Earth-2 Hourman I

Comics characters introduced in 1940
DC Comics characters with superhuman strength
DC Comics characters who can move at superhuman speeds
DC Comics male superheroes
DC Comics scientists
DC Comics titles
Earth-Two
DC Comics characters with accelerated healing
DC Comics metahumans
DC Comics martial artists
Golden Age superheroes